Stephen Wade is an Australian politician.

Stephen Wade may also refer to:

Stephen Wade (musician) (born 1953), folk musician
Stephen Wade (executioner) (1887–1956), British hangman